The unrepresented voters are considered the total amount of voters not represented by any party sitting in the legislature in the case of proportional representation. In contrast, the related concept of wasted votes generally applies to plurality voting, which generally has a higher percentage of wasted votes. The unrepresented voters can be given as a percentage of the total amount of votes or as the absolute number of votes. The unrepresented voters increases with a higher electoral threshold, one of the ways to reduce political fragmentation. Even with no explicit electoral threshold, the natural electoral threshold applies.

On occasion, unrepresented voters have resulted in a party winning an outright majority of seats without winning an outright majority of votes, the sort of outcome that a proportional voting system is supposed to prevent. For instance, in the 2002 Turkish general election the party AKP won more than two-thirds of the seats in the Parliament with just 34.28% of the vote. In the 2013 Bavarian federal state election in Germany, the party CSU failed to obtain a majority of votes but won an outright majority of seats.

Change of unrepresented voters over time

Unrepresented voters changes from one election to another depending on voter behavior and size of effective electoral threshold, here shown for New Zealand. In New Zealand in 2005 every party above 1% got seats due to the electoral threshold in New Zealand of at least one seat in first-past-the-post voting, which caused a much lower unrepresented voters compared to the other years.

Examples of high unrepresented voters 
In Poland, in 1993 the unrepresented voters reached 34.4%. In the Russian parliamentary elections in 1995 more than 45% of votes went unrepresented. In the 2002 Turkish general election as many as 46.33% (14,545,438) of votes were cast for parties that were unrepresented in the parliament. In the Ukrainian elections of March 2006, 22% of voters were effectively disenfranchised. In the 2007 Ukrainian parliamentary election held under the same system, fewer voters supported minor parties and the total percentage of disenfranchised voters fell to about 12%. In Bulgaria, 24% of voters cast their ballots for parties that would not gain representation in the elections of 1991 and 2013. In Germany in 2013 15.7% or 6.9 million votes were unrepresented. In New Zealand, the unrepresented vote was 4.62% in 2017 and in 2020 it was 7.71%. During Danish general elections on Faroe Islands the unrepresented vote reached 51.3% in 2015 and 46.2% in 2019, while on Greenland in 2015 21.96% and in 2019 34.2% of voters were not represented in the Parliament of Denmark. In 2019 European Parliament election in France 19.79% of voters were unrepresented. In the 2020 Slovak parliamentary election, 28.39% of all valid votes did not gain representation. In the 2021 Czech legislative election, 19.76 percent of voters were not represented. In the 2022 Slovenian parliamentary election, 24% of the vote went to parties that did not reach the electoral threshold. In German federal state Saarland 2022 election the total unrepresented voters was 22.3%. In 2015 Israeli legislative election the unrepresented vote was 7.1% In 2022 Latvian parliamentary election unrepresented voters reached 29%.

Examples of low unrepresented voters 
In 2015 Danish general election, where MMP was used, the unrepresented vote calculated by the formula above in Denmark proper was 0.92%. 
In 2018 Swedish general election the unrepresented vote was 1.5%. In Netherlands the unrepresented vote was 1.55% in 2017 and 1.99% in 2021. The low percentage in Netherlands is caused by a low explicit electoral threshold of 0.67%. In 2005 New Zealand general election the unrepresented vote was 1.5%. The 2019 Swiss federal election had unrepresented voters of 1.3%, caused by natural electoral thresholds.

Legal status 
The German Federal Constitutional Court rejected an electoral threshold for the European Parliament in 2011 and in 2014 based on the principle of one person, one vote.
In the case of Turkey, in 2004 the Parliamentary Assembly of the Council of Europe declared this threshold to be manifestly excessive and asked Turkey to lower it (Council of Europe Resolution 1380 (2004)). On 30 January 2007 the European Court of Human Rights ruled by five votes to two and on 8 July 2008, its Grand Chamber by 13 votes to four that the 10% threshold imposed in Turkey does not violate the right to free elections, guaranteed by the European Convention of Human Rights. It held, however, that this same threshold could violate the Convention if imposed in a different country. It was justified in the case of Turkey in order to stabilize the volatile political situation over recent decades.

See also
 Wasted vote
 Measuring disproportionality
 Loosemore–Hanby index
 Gallagher index
 No taxation without representation
 Natural electoral threshold

References

Electoral systems
Psephology